Sri Ramadasu  is 2006 Indian Telugu-language biographical film, based on the life of musician saint Kancharla Gopanna, produced by Konda Krishnam Raju on Aditya Movies banner and directed by K. Raghavendra Rao. Starring Akkineni Nageswara Rao, Nagarjuna, Suman, Sneha  and music was composed by M. M. Keeravani. Cinematography and editing were handled by S. Gopal Reddy and Sreekar Prasad respectively. Upon release, the film got positive reviews.

Nagarjuna received appreciation for his portrayal in the titular role and subsequently went on to win Nandi Award for Best Actor that year. Music director M. M. Keeravani also received rave reviews for his work. Along with being critically acclaimed,  the film recorded as Blockbuster hit at the box office. The film won four Nandi Awards.

Plot
The film starts with the penance of Sage Bhadra (Sarath Babu) who becomes a hill with the blessings of Lord Rama. In later centuries, Dammakka (Sujatha), the tribal lady, and worshiper of Lord Rama unearths and looks after the idols of Rama on the hill and awaits someone who can constructs a temple there. On the other hand, Gopanna and his cousin Kamala fall in love and marry after a small conflict with their parents. After the marriage, Tanisha, the emperor of Golconda, with the recommendation of Akkanna and Madanna (the uncles of Gopanna), appoints Gopanna as Tehsildar of Husnabad. Thus, a Muslim who had been the Tehsildar to the place is dethroned for the sake of Gopanna. That ignites disgust among a few groups who attempt to murder Gopanna. However, Dammakka saves him while he lies unconscious on the bank of Godavari. She shows him the place of Bhadragiri and Gopanna becomes an ardent devotee of Rama. After a series of incidents, he decides to construct the Rama Mandir on the hill. He collects funds from people and with the help of Kabirdas, his guru, completes the construction of the temple. Lord Rama, Lakshmana, Seetha, and Anjaneya live in invisible forms in the place during the construction. They keep on guarding Gopanna until he accomplishes his mission. Thus, with immense bhakti on Lord Rama, Gopanna becomes Ramadasu.

The enemies of Ramadasu pass on a negative message to Tanisha about him, stating that he constructed the temple with money taken from other people without the king's permission. Exasperated, Tanisha imprisons Ramadasu. After many ordeals faced by Ramadasu in prison, Lord Rama, and Lakshmana appear to Tanisha in a dream and pay the required amount to him. Then Tanisha releases Ramadasu from prison and discovers that the two who cleared the debt were Lord Rama and Lakshmana. After being released from prison, Ramadasu is frustrated that he never obtained a darshanam (appearance/glimpse) of Rama. He realizes that Rama is in his heart and cuts open his chest. Sri Rama and Sitamma appear from his heart and heal his wounds. Rama offers Gopanna the chance to go to Vaikunta as a living man, a boon granted to few. When Gopanna asks what is there in Vaikunta (The Highest Heaven), Rama says there is only happiness and no need to pray. However, Gopanna can only find happiness in saying Rama's name. As the only man ever to refuse Vaikuntha, Rama grants his wish: Ramadasu's spirit will remain forever in the Bhadrachalam Temple. The movie ends with Kancherla Gopanna, now Sri Ramadasu, looking down fondly at the temple in the modern day.

Cast

 Akkineni Nageswara Rao as Kabirdas
 Nagarjuna as Kancherla Gopanna / Bhakta Ramadasu
 Suman as Lord Rama / Lord Vishnu
 Sneha as Kamala 
 Veda Sastry as Goddess Sita / Goddess Lakshmi
 Sujatha as Dammakka
 Nassar as Abul Hasan Qutb Shah
 K.Naga Babu as Ravana
 Brahmanandam
 Sunil
 Dharmavarapu Subramanyam as Seshabhisha Sastry
 Tanikella Bharani as Kamal's father
 Venu Madhav
 AVS
 Ali
 Raghu Babu
 Sameer Hasan as Lakshmana
 Sarath Babu as Sage Bhadra
 Vindu Dara Singh as Hanuman
 Jaya Prakash Reddy as Mathisahib
 Ranganath as Gopanna's father
 Raghunatha Reddy
 Subbaraya Sharma
 Ananth Babu
 Chitti Babu
 Duvvasi Mohan
 J. K. Bharavi
 Sudha as Gopanna's mother
 Siva Parvathi as Kamala's mother
 Hema as Tanisha's wife
 Apoorva
 Master Sajja Teja as Raghunathudu (Ramadasu's son)

Casting
It was announced that Nagarjuna would do a film, produced by Konda Krishnam Raju on Aditya Movies banner and directed by K. Raghavendra Rao.Jyothika was roped in to play the female lead, but refused the offer due to her marriage preparations. Then she was replaced by  Sneha later.

Soundtrack

Music was composed by M. M. Keeravani. Lyrics are written by Veturi, Chandrabose, Suddala Ashok Teja, Sri Vedavyasa, J. K. Bharavi and Siva Shakthi Datta while vocals are given by S. P. Balasubrahmanyam, Chitra, Shankar Mahadevan, M. M. Keeravani, Vijay Yesudas, Devi Sri Prasad, S. P. B. Charan, Madhu Balakrishnan, Hariharan, Sunitha, Malavika and Pranavi. Music was released on Aditya Music Company.

Reception
Upon release, the film was met with highly positive reviews. The lead actor Nagarjuna and music director M. M. Keeravani received extremely positive appreciations for their respective works in this film. Particularly, Nagarjuna's performance was highly praised by most of the critics.

Telugu movie reviewing website idle brain gave 3.75 out of 5 and wrote,  "He (Nagarjuna) did extremely well in the title role. His histrionics in the last reel where ‘Dasaradhi’ song comes are extraordinary. Nobody knows how Sri Ramadasu looks like and whenever we think about Sri Ramadasu in the future, the image of Nagarjuna becomes the visual aid. The first half of the film is decent. The emotional graph starts growing up from ‘Antha Ramamayam’ song and goes to the peak by the film reaches climax. The second half of the film is very good. The plus points of this film are Nagarjuna's histrionics, Keeravani's music, K Raghavendra Rao's direction of J. K. Bharavi's script. Sri Ramadasu film comes as fresh breeze when we are bombarded with routine and formula flicks. I recommend this devotional flick to everybody."

Another reviewing website India glitz gave an extremely positive review and praised Nagarjuna's performance, in particular, stating, "Nagarjuna is a revelation in a role that calls for nuances and skill. It is no romp for him. He has put in hard labor both in terms of looks as well as body language. The triumph of this role lies in the fact that Nags got the subtleties right. An award is just round the corner for him. Keeravani in a sense is the other hero of the movie. There are 19 songs, each dipped in his own devotion to his art. Like in Annamaiya (Annamayya), he has delivered more than he has been asked for. His songs create the right mood and momentum for the film to proceed. The bhakti rasa is splendidly brought out."

The Hindu praised Nagarjuna and M. M. Keeravani and wrote, "Nagarjuna steals the show as Ramadasu. After playing the role of his lifetime in Annamayya, Nagarjuna comes up with another winner in Sri Ramadasu. Nag (Nagarjuna) once again proves he is equally at ease portraying epic characters apart from playing mass, sentiment and glamor roles.  The highlight of the film is the performance of Nagarjuna in the prison episode. Keeravani gives a musical chartbuster and both songs as well as background score and re-recording is excellent and takes the audience into a musical journey. Graphic works are superb."

Release
Sri Ramadasu was released in 229 screens including 173 in Andhra Pradesh 18 in Karnataka, two in Chennai, one in Mumbai and 25 overseas.

Box-office performance
The film had a 100-day run in 67 centres and collected over 30 crores.

Awards
Filmfare Awards - 2006
 Filmfare Award for Best Male Playback Singer - Telugu - S.P. Balasubramaniam
 Filmfare Award for Best Cinematographer – South - S. Gopal Reddy

Nandi Awards - 2006 
 Best Home-viewing Feature Film - Konda Krishnam Raju
 Best Actor  - Nagarjuna
 Best Makeup Artist  - Ramachandra Rao
 Best Costume Designer - Basha

References

External links
 Official website
 

2006 films
2000s Telugu-language films
Indian biographical films
Indian epic films
Films scored by M. M. Keeravani
Films about religion
Films directed by K. Raghavendra Rao
Hindu devotional films
History of India on film